Kulkeh Rash-e Olya (also Romanized as Kūlkeh Rash-e ‘Olyā) is a village in Baryaji Rural District, in the Central District of Sardasht County, West Azerbaijan Province, Iran. At the 2006 census, its population was 44, in 7 families.

References 

Populated places in Sardasht County